This is the electoral history of Julian Castro, who served as the 16th United States Secretary of Housing and Urban Development from 2014 to 2017. He previously served in the San Antonio City Council from 2001 to 2005 and as Mayor of San Antonio from 2009 to 2014. Castro sought the 2020 Democratic nomination for President, but ended his campaign before voting began.

San Antonio City Council elections

2001

2003

San Antonio Mayoral elections

2005

As no candidate reached a majority, a runoff election between the two leading candidates (Castro and Hardberger) was required.

2009

2011

2013

2014 Secretary of Housing and Urban Development confirmation

2020 Democratic party presidential primaries

Despite ending his campaign before voting began, Castro still appeared on the ballot in over a dozen states, including his home state of Texas. Castro won 37,037 votes, including 16,688 in Texas.

References 

Julian Castro
Castro, Julian
Castro, Julian